Eupithecia affinitata is a moth in the  family Geometridae. It is found in Colombia.

References

Moths described in 1890
affinitata
Moths of South America